Yuriy Mykhaylovych Dmytrulin (born 10 February 1975 in Snihurivka) is a retired Ukrainian professional footballer (defender). He is 175 cm tall and weighed 71 kg.

Career
Dmytrulin was born on 10 February 1975 in the city of Snihurivka, at the time part of the Ukrainian SSR of the Soviet Union (in the Mykolaiv Oblast of present-day Ukraine).

He was a versatile full-back for Dynamo Kyiv since 1992 and one of the leading defenders in Ukraine along with Oleksandr Holovko, Vladyslav Vaschuk, and others. During his stay in the club Dmytrulin became a nine-times champion of Ukraine, while raising the national cup over his head six times. He was instrumental for Dynamo Kyiv to reach semi-finals of the Champion's League in 1999. Dmytrulin also capped nearly 40 games for the national side, debuting on 13 August 1996 in the game against Lithuania. His single goal came on 5 June 1999 in the game against Andorra (4:0) during the UEFA Euro 2000 qualifying campaign.

After retiring from the professional football in 2008, Dmytrulin continued to play for short while in amateurs, particularly for FC Irpin Horenychi (Kyiv Oblast) that managed to win the national amateur cup in 2008.

Career statistics

International goals

Honours
 Ukrainian Premier League champion: 1995, 1996, 1997, 1998, 1999, 2000, 2001, 2003, 2004.
 Ukrainian Cup winner: 1993, 1996, 1998, 1999, 2000, 2003, 2005.
 Ukrainian Super Cup winner: 2004
 Five times was selected to the Ukrainian Best-33, a fantasy team of the best performers for a past season.

External links 
 
 http://www.ukrsoccerhistory.com/index.aspx?page=starstext&cp=127 

1975 births
Living people
People from Snihurivka
Ukrainian footballers
Ukraine international footballers
Ukraine under-21 international footballers
Ukrainian Premier League players
FC Dynamo Kyiv players
SC Tavriya Simferopol players
FC Shinnik Yaroslavl players
Russian Premier League players
Ukrainian expatriate footballers
Expatriate footballers in Russia
Association football defenders
Sportspeople from Mykolaiv Oblast